Puerto Villarroel is a locality in the Cochabamba Department in central Bolivia. It is the seat of Puerto Villarroel Municipality, the fifth municipal section of Carrasco Province. At the time of census 2001 it had a population of 1,778.

References

External links
 Map of Carrasco Province

Populated places in Cochabamba Department

it:Puerto Villarroel